Charles Arnoldi, also known as Chuck Arnoldi and as Charles Arthur Arnoldi is an American painter, sculptor and printmaker. He was born April 10, 1946, in Dayton, Ohio.

While visiting a girlfriend's grandmother in New York, he took the opportunity to view works by Jackson Pollock and Willem de Kooning.  Observing their smudges, smears, and imperfections, he sensed that he too was capable of such work, and decided to attend art school.  Arnoldi attended Ventura College in Ventura, California, where a professor convinced him to apply to the Art Center in Los Angeles.  He was accepted with a scholarship, and enrolled in commercial illustration classes.  It was the late 1960s, and Arnoldi recalls a stifling classroom environment where male students were required to wear ties.  After only two weeks, he left and transferred to the Chouinard Art Institute in Los Angeles in 1968, where he remained for eight months before deciding to abandon his formal education and complete his training through his art practice.  Arnoldi began using actual tree branches as a compositional element in his works, combined with painting to create stick constructions.  These works did not endeavor to create illusions but rather inhabited physical space.

In the early 1970s, the artist attracted attention for his wall-relief wood sculptures, such as Honeymoons in the collection of the Honolulu Museum of Art.  He had his first solo exhibition at the Riko Mizuno Gallery in Los Angeles in 1971.  The following year he was included in Documenta V, Kassel, Germany, 1972.  In 1977, he had his first stick sculpture cast in bronze.  Roark, in the collection of the Honolulu Museum of Art, is a monumental example of this technique.  The use of wood remained a feature of Arnoldi's oeuvre, although, since the 1980s, he has often employed it in combination with other media.  In the 1990s, Arnoldi's output changed radically.  He began producing abstract paintings on canvas, first black and white, and later brightly colored.  Justice is an example of these free-flowing organic paintings.  He played himself in the 2005 film, Sketches of Frank Gehry, directed by Sydney Pollack.  Arnoldi lives and works in Los Angeles.

Further reading
 Arnoldi, Charles, Charles Arnoldi: 1972-2008, Santa Fe, New Mexico: Radius Books, 2008. 
 Arnoldi, Charles, Charles Arnoldi, A Mid-Career Survey: 1970-1996, Los Angeles: Fred Hoffman Fine Art, 1996
 Arnoldi, Charles, Charles Arnoldi, Osaka: Gallery Kuranuki, 1991
 Arnoldi, Charles, Charles Arnoldi: Recent Monotypes from the Garner Tullis Workshop,  New York: Pamela Auchincloss Gallery, 1989
 Arts Club of Chicago, Charles Arnoldi, A Survey: 1971-1986, Chicago: Arts Club of Chicago, 1986
 Busan Metropolitan Art Museum, Harmony of Line and Color, Charles Arnoldi, Busan: Busan Metropolitan Art Museum, 2002
 Butterfield, Jan, Charles Arnoldi, Laddie John Dill, Fullerton, Calif.: California State University at Fullerton Art Gallery, 1983 
 California State University at Fullerton, Arnoldi/Cooper/McCollum/Wudl, Fullerton, Calif.: California State University at Fullerton Art Gallery, 1972
 California State University, Arnoldi: Just Bronze, Long Beach, Calif.: California State University, Long Beach, 1987  
 Cooper, Ron & Laddie John Dill, Recent Works: Charles Arnoldi, Santa Fe: Sena Galleries West, 1987
 Gehry, Frank O, Charles Arnoldi, New York: Charles Cowles Gallery, 1994
 Honolulu Museum of Art, Spalding House Self-guided Tour, Sculpture Garden, 2014, p. 10
 Los Angeles County Museum of Art, Charles Arnoldi: Unique Prints, Los Angeles: Los Angeles County Museum of Art, 1984
 Museo ItaloAmericano, Charles Arnoldi: Painting and Sculpture, 1971-1988, San Francisco: Museo ItaloAmericano, 1988
 University of Missouri-Kansas City, Arnoldi: Recent Paintings, Kansas City: University of Missouri-Kansas City, 1986
 Zakian, Michael, Charles Arnoldi: Wood, Malibu, California: The Frederick R. Weisman Museum of Art, Pepperdine University, 2008

Footnotes

Artists from Dayton, Ohio
20th-century American painters
American male painters
21st-century American painters
21st-century American male artists
Chouinard Art Institute alumni
Modern sculptors
1946 births
Living people
20th-century American sculptors
20th-century American male artists
American male sculptors
20th-century American printmakers
Sculptors from Ohio